The Wood Nymph is a lost 1916 silent film whose story was written by D. W. Griffith as Granville Warwick, produced by his Fine Arts Film company, directed by Paul Powell and distributed by the Triangle Film Corporation. This film stars Marie Doro, a stage actress recently arrived in films, in a Gishian type of role and was expressly written for her by Griffith.

Cast
Marie Doro – Daphne
Frank Campeau – David Arnold
Wilfred Lucas – Fred Arnold
Charles West – William Jones
Cora Drew – Mrs. Arnold
Fred Graham – Pete
Pearl Elsmore – Hippolyta

Notes

References

External links

Still of Marie Doro for the film

1916 films
American silent feature films
Films directed by Paul Powell (director)
Lost American films
Films based on short fiction
1916 drama films
Silent American drama films
American black-and-white films
1916 lost films
Lost drama films
1910s American films